Sin Restricciones is the second studio album by Argentine band Miranda!, released on September 21, 2004 by Secsy Discos.

Background and release 
At the beginning of 2004, while their first album, Es Mentira, was being edited in Mexico and Chile, after being remixed and remastered by Tony Rodriguez, Mario Breuer and Andrés Breuer, the band finished recording and mixing their second album. Produced by Árbol members Eduardo Schmidt and Pablo Romero, the album was mixed at Panda studios in Buenos Aires and mastered in Los Angeles, United States, by Tom Baker.

After the release of the album and the good reception by the public, the band performed their first two sold-out concerts, at the Teatro Gran Rex. The recording of the shows were chosen to be the group's first live DVD: En Vivo Sin Restricciones!, which was released in July 2005.

Accolades 
Sin Restricciones gave Miranda! their first nomination for the Carlos Gardel Awards, being in the category of Best Pop Group Album, which they ended up winning.

Track listing 
All songs written by Alejandro Sergi and produced by Eduardo Schmidt and Pablo Romero.

Credits and personnel 
Credits adapted from AllMusic.
 Alejandro Sergi – vocals, composition, programming
 Juliana Gattas – vocals
 Demian Chorovicz – mixing
 Leandro Fuentes – guitar 
 Monoto – bass 
 Pablo Romero – production, acoustic guitar 
 Eduardo Schmidt – production 
 Bruno De Vincenti – programming
 Tom Baker – mastering
 Nicolás Grimaldi – graphic design

Charts

Weekly charts

Year-end charts

Certifications and sales

References 

2004 albums
Spanish-language albums
Miranda! albums